Doktor ludosti is a Croatian comedy film directed by Fadil Hadzic. It was released in 2003.

Cast
 Igor Mešin - Novinar Horkic mladji
 Pero Kvrgić - Dr. Emil Hofbauer
 Damir Lončar - Poslovni covjek
 Elizabeta Kukić - Svadljiva gospodja
 Žarko Potočnjak - Ignjac Dobrohotic
 Milan Strljic - Reporter Horkic stariji
 Zoran Pokupec - Oto Puba Zbunjakovic
 Predrag Vušović - General (as Predrag Vusovic)
 Olga Pakalović - Zbunjakoviceva kci
 Dražen Kuhn - Obavjestajac Igor Kulenko
 Boris Dvornik - Prolaznik
 Ivan Lovriček - Prolaznik
 Ivan Zadro - Nasmijani covjek (as Ivica Zadro)
 Jadranka Matković - Radikalka
 Mladen Domas - Adjutant
 Inge Apelt - Cistacica

External links
 

2003 films
2000s Croatian-language films
2003 comedy films
Films directed by Fadil Hadžić
Croatian comedy films